Johann Georg Heinrich Hassel (30 December 1770 in Wolfenbüttel – 18 January 1829 in Weimar) was a German geographer and statistician. He was an influential figure in the early 19th century and published several large books of geography and statistics. Hassel was elected a Foreign Honorary Member of the American Academy of Arts and Sciences in 1828.

References

 Dictionnaire universel d'histoire et de géographie. 1847
 Schildt: Hassel, Johann Georg Heinrich. In: Horst-Rüdiger Jarck und Günter Schell (Hrsg.): Braunschweigisches biographisches Lexikon. Hahn, Hannover 1996

1770 births
1829 deaths
Fellows of the American Academy of Arts and Sciences
Corresponding members of the Saint Petersburg Academy of Sciences
German geographers
German statisticians